The liquidation of the Zaporozhian Sich in 1775 was the forcible destruction by Russian troops of the Cossack formation, the Nova (Pidpilnenska) Sich, and the final liquidation of the Zaporozhian Sich as a semi-autonomous Cossack polity. As a result, the Zaporozhian Lowland Army ceased to exist.

Prerequisites for liquidation 
March Articles of 1654. After the palace coup of 1762, Catherine II, the wife of Emperor Peter III, ascended the imperial throne and immediately made every effort to strengthen the power of the autocracy in the vast empire. An important aspect of the Empress's policy was the so-called "Russification of the Polishized suburbs" . Such plans of Catherine II did not provide for the existence of the Cossack state of the Cossack Hetmanate, or the Cossack liberties, or the Zaporozhian Sich. The term sich is a noun related to the Eastern Slavic verb sich''' (сѣчь), meaning "to chop" or "cut"; it may have been associated with the usual wood sharp-spiked stockades around Cossack settlements.

When the Hetmanate was liquidated in 1764, and a year later the regimental-hundred system in Slobozhanshchyna, the last stronghold was the Zaporizhzhya Sich, which in Russian ruling circles was seen as a "hut of rebels and bandits." The Moscow authorities were just waiting for the right opportunity to liquidate the Cossack freemasonry.

 Liquidation of the Sich 
This opportunity came in 1775, when the Russo-Turkish War (1768-1774) ended, which the Cossacks helped Moscow win, and the Cossacks became unnecessary. On April 23, 1775, the Council of the Imperial Court decided to liquidate the Sich. In early June 1775, Russian troops under the command of Russian General of Serbian descent Peter Tekeli, returning from an Ottoman campaign, suddenly surrounded Sich. The Cossacks did not expect such a development, and therefore in Zaporozhye at that time there were very few soldiers. There were only a few thousand Cossacks in the Sich at that time, and the rest went to palanquins and winter quarters after the war. Instead, under the command of Peter Tekeli were significant forces: 10 infantry and 13 Don Cossack regiments, 8 regiments of regular cavalry, reinforced by 20 Hussars and 17 Pikin squadrons. Peter Tekelia announced an imperial decree to eliminate the Zaporozhian Sich. The Sich society, given the very unequal forces, had no choice but to surrender to the will of the victors. It was clear to everyone that the resistance of several thousand besieged Cossacks would be in vain, and the breakthrough of other Cossack troops to the besieged Sich was almost impossible for many reasons. Among these reasons is the large number of Russian troops and the fact that almost all the Cossack officers were in the Sich, as a result of which the Cossacks who were not surrounded were left without command.

A council headed by Kosh Ataman Petro Kalnyshevskyi convened at the Sich, and fierce debates erupted in an attempt to find a way out of the hopeless situation in which the Zaporozhian Cossacks found themselves. The council decided not to shed Christian blood and voluntarily laid down its arms in front of the Muscovites. In addition, the Cossacks feared in case of resistance to bloody revenge on Cossack families, the Sich still had old Cossacks who remembered the events of 1709, when Peter I conducted a brutal punitive expedition against Ukraine, including the infamous Baturyn massacre that became the culmination of those horrible events. Zaporozhian Cossacks took part in many campaigns of the Russian army and witnessed the brutality of Russian troops in storming enemy settlements. As the participants in the events at the Sich recalled: the characters did not want to surrender to Catherine at all, and other Cossacks said: “No, brother, we have parents and children: a Muscovite will cut them. They took it and surrendered".

 Consequences of the liquidation of the Zaporozhian Sich 
Shortly before the destruction of the Sich, the Cossack fleet was transferred to almost the entire Danube. The Ottoman sultan gave the Cossacks the island of St. George with the Sulina and St. George estuaries of the Danube near the Danubian Sich and issued jewels - a mace, a bunchuk, a seal and a korogva consecrated by the Patriarch of Constantinople. Some Cossacks soon formed the basis of the Poltava and Kherson regiments.

The organization and rapid strengthening of the Transdanubian Sich aroused growing sympathy among the Ukrainian population and made it impossible for Ukrainians to take part in the war on Russia's side. Thus, the destruction of the Zaporozhian Sich and the formation of the Transdanubian Sich, not controlled by St. Petersburg, led to the fact that the southwestern borders of the Russian Empire were defenseless. On October 31, 1776, Grigory Potemkin reported this to Catherine II.

Attempts to keep the Cossacks from emigrating to the Danube and Zabuzhye were unsuccessful. Then Catherine II on May 5, 1779, and April 27, 1780, issued manifestos asking the Cossacks to return to their native land, promising to give each of them land and service in Russian ranks. These calls also failed.

 See also 

 Liquidation of the autonomy of the Cossack Hetmanate
 Abolition of the Cossack system in Sloboda Ukraine
 Sack of Baturyn

 References 

 Sources 

 Джерела про зруйнування Запорозької Січі / Зібрав та упорядкував Василь Сокіл. НАН України. Інститут народознавства. Відділ фольклористики. — Львів: Афіша, 2005. — 128 c. ISBN 966-325-054-2 , .
 Левітас Ф., Тарасенко М.'' Історія України. — Київ: «Казка», 2005. — С. 323–324. — ISBN 978-966-8055-18-8.
 Полонська-Василенко Н. Маніфест 3 серпня року 1775 в світлі тогочас. ідей. «Зап. Істор.-філол. відділу ВУАН», 1927, кн. 12. (текст Маніфесту  — С. 31.(рос.))

External links 

 Маніфест «Про знищення Запорізької Січі та зарахування оної до Новоросійської губернії» 1775 // Юридична енциклопедія : [у 6 т.] / ред. кол.: Ю. С. Шемшученко (відп. ред.) [та ін.]. — К. : Українська енциклопедія ім. М. П. Бажана, 2001. — Т. 3 : К — М. — 792 с. — ISBN 966-7492-03-6.

1775 in Ukraine
Russian–Ukrainian wars
Russia–Ukraine military relations
Russia–Ukraine relations
Wars of independence
Zaporizhian Sich